Find the Lady is a 1936 British comedy film directed by Roland Grillette and starring Jack Melford, Althea Henley and George Sanders. Its plot involves an American confidence trickster who pretends to be a spiritual healer. The film was made at Wembley Studios as a quota quickie by the British subsidiary of 20th Century Fox. The sets were designed by art director William Hemsley.

Cast
 Jack Melford as Schemer Doyle
 Althea Henley as Venus Doyle
 George Sanders as Curly Randall
 Viola Compton as Lady Waldron
 Violet Loxley as Wilma Waldron
 Ben Williams as uncredited

References

Bibliography
 Chibnall, Steve. Quota Quickies: The British of the British 'B' Film. British Film Institute, 2007.
 Low, Rachael. Filmmaking in 1930s Britain. George Allen & Unwin, 1985.
 Wood, Linda. British Films, 1927-1939. British Film Institute, 1986.

External links

1936 films
1936 comedy films
British comedy films
British films based on plays
Films shot at Wembley Studios
20th Century Fox films
Films with screenplays by Edward Dryhurst
Quota quickies
British black-and-white films
1930s English-language films
1930s British films